Haji Khanzada Khan is a Pakistani politician who has been a member of the Senate of Pakistan since 2015. Previously he has been a member of the National Assembly of Pakistan from 2008 to 2013. Since he joined the party, Khan has served with great loyalty to the nation and remains an active member.

Education
He has done Bachelor of Business Administration from Al-Khair University in 2003.

Political career
He was elected to the National Assembly of Pakistan from NA-6 (Mardan-I) as a candidate of Pakistan Peoples Party (PPP) in 1993 Pakistani general election.

He was re-elected to the National Assembly from NA-11 (Mardan-III) as a candidate of PPP in 2008 Pakistani general election.

He ran for the seat of the National Assembly from NA-11 (Mardan-III) as a candidate of PPP in 2013 Pakistani general election but was unsuccessful.

He was elected to the Senate of Pakistan as a candidate of PPP in 2015 Pakistani Senate election.

References 

Pashtun people
Living people
People from Mardan District
Pakistan People's Party politicians
Pakistani senators (14th Parliament)
Pakistani MNAs 1993–1996
Pakistani MNAs 2008–2013
Year of birth missing (living people)